Thorp Ridges is a three almost parallel ridges standing 18 nautical miles (33 km) west of Stor Hanakken Mountain in Enderby Land. Plotted from air photos taken from ANARE (Australian National Antarctic Research Expeditions) aircraft in 1956. Named by Antarctic Names Committee of Australia (ANCA) for A. Thorp, electrical fitter at Wilkes Station in 1961.

References

Ridges of Enderby Land